Alemayehu Eshete Andarge (French pronunciation: Alèmayèhu Eshèté; June 1941 – 2 September 2021) was an Ethiopian singer. He had performed since the 1960s and primarily in Amharic. He had been nicknamed "the Ethiopian Elvis".

Early life and career
Alemayehu was born in June 1941 in Addis Ababa, where his father worked as a taxi driver. Alemayehu talent was recognized by Colonel Retta Demeqe, who invited the young singer to perform with Addis Ababa's famous Police Orchestra. He had his first hit "Seul" in 1961 before moving on to found the Alem-Girma Band with Girma Beyene. Over the course of 15 years, Alemayehu released some 30 singles until the arrival of the communist junta Derg. Alemayehu continued working as a musician under the Derg and was once ordered to perform in Korean for Kim Il-sung.

Alemayehu gained fame in Europe and the Americas with the release of Buda Musique's Ethiopiques series of compilations on compact disc. Ethiopiques Volume 9 is devoted entirely to recordings of his earlier music, and Volume 22 covers his career between 1972 and 1974. Other songs have also appeared on Volumes 3, 8, 10, and 13 or the series. In 2008, Alemayehu toured the United States with fellow Ethiopian singer Mahmoud Ahmed, backed by Boston's 10-piece Either/Orchestra.

Death
Alemayehu died at midnight on 2 September 2021 in a hospital located in Addis Ababa. He was spending his last days with his friends and complained about discomfort after going home at 7 a.m (local time). Some sources indicate that he had been suffering from heart disease. He was buried on 7 September at Holy Trinity Cathedral. Before his body was transported to the cathedral, a farewell ceremony took place at Meskel Square with tens of thousands of attendants, and his two songs "Temar Lije" and "Addis Ababa Bete" were played for tribute. He is survived by seven children and six grandchildren.

Discography

References

External links
Addis Journal: Stencil Paintings for the Ethiopian Music Festival
 
 

1941 births
2021 deaths
20th-century Ethiopian male singers
Ethiopian jazz musicians
21st-century Ethiopian male singers
Buda Musique artists